The 2019 Open Championship was the 148th Open Championship, played  at Royal Portrush Golf Club in County Antrim, Northern Ireland. It was the second Open Championship at Portrush, which last hosted in 1951, won by Max Faulkner. Royal Portrush saw major alterations in preparation for the tournament, including replacing two of the holes.

Shane Lowry won his first major title by six strokes over Tommy Fleetwood. Ranked 33rd coming into the tournament, Lowry's previous biggest wins were the 2015 WGC-Bridgestone Invitational and the 2019 Abu Dhabi HSBC Championship. Lowry became the second player from the Republic of Ireland to win a major after Pádraig Harrington.

Lowry shot 67 in both the first and second rounds to share the lead with J. B. Holmes after 36 holes. He shot a course record (since the 2016 renovation) 63 in the third round to have a four-stroke lead over Tommy Fleetwood going into the final day. After shooting a 72 in challenging conditions on the last day, Lowry was able to convert a four-shot 54-hole lead into major victory, after failing to do the same at the 2016 U.S. Open at Oakmont. Fleetwood finished solo second for the second time in a major, having previously achieved the feat at the 2018 U.S. Open at Shinnecock Hills.

Major champions Darren Clarke, Graeme McDowell, and Rory McIlroy competed in a major in their native Northern Ireland for the first time. Clarke was given the honour of the opening tee shot and described the event as a watershed moment for Northern Ireland, as hosting was seen as unrealistic during the years when violence ravaged the province. McIlroy was the pre-tournament favourite but shot an 8-over-par 79 in the first round, which included a quadruple bogey eight on the first hole, a double bogey five on the 16th, and a triple bogey seven on the 18th. Despite shooting a 6-under-par 65 in the second round for a two-over-par total, he missed the cut by a single stroke.	
Clarke also missed the cut, and McDowell finished tied-57th.

Defending champion Francesco Molinari made the cut on the number and finished tied for 11th with a 3-under-par 281. Brooks Koepka finished tied 4th to become the fifth player, after Jordan Spieth, Rickie Fowler, Jack Nicklaus, and Tiger Woods, to finish top-five in all four majors in a single season.

The 36-hole cut was 143 (+1) and better; 73 advanced to the weekend, but no amateurs, so the Silver Medal was not awarded this year.

Media
The 2019 Open Championship was televised by the Comcast Group in the United Kingdom, Republic of Ireland (both on Sky Sports), and the United States (Golf Channel on its cable service on Thursday and Friday, while on NBC its broadcast service on weekends). It was the fourth year of both channels airing the tournament, but the first since Comcast acquired Sky in late 2018, vertically integrating the two. At the 2019 Players Championship, Comcast integrated the two channels' coverage for the first time since the acquisition, and is expected to feature coverage from both networks' commentators.

Venue

Changes to the course for the Open

Specialists Mackenzie & Ebert oversaw changes to the course in preparation for the 2019 Open. The work began in 2015 and it was the first major changes to the Harry Colt designed links since the 1930s. Changes included:
 Removing the 17th and 18th holes. Holes 7 to 16 became holes 9 to 18.
 Two new holes (the current 7th and 8th), which were created with land taken from the Valley course.
 Reshaping some of the greens.
 Nine holes had new tees, there were several new bunkers, and the course was lengthened by 201 yards.

Card of the course
Dunluce Links – Championship tees

If required a three-hole aggregate playoff, followed by sudden death, would have used the 1st, 13th, and 18th holes.

Length of the course for the previous Open:
 1951: , par 72

Field
The Open Championship field was made up of 156 players, who gained entry through various exemption criteria and qualifying tournaments. The criteria included past Open champions, recent major winners, top ranked players in the world rankings and from the leading world tours, and winners and high finishers from various designated tournaments, including the Open Qualifying Series; the winners of designated amateur events, including The Amateur Championship and U.S. Amateur, also gained exemption provided they remain an amateur. Anyone not qualifying via exemption, and had a handicap of 0.4 or lower, could gain entry through regional and final qualifying events.

Criteria and exemptions
Each player is classified according to the first category in which he qualified, but other categories are shown in parentheses.

1. The Open Champions aged 60 or under on 21 July 2019

Stewart Cink (2)
Darren Clarke (2)
David Duval
Ernie Els (2)
Pádraig Harrington
Zach Johnson (2)
Paul Lawrie
Tom Lehman
Rory McIlroy (2,3,4,5,10,11,12,15)
Phil Mickelson (2,4,12,15)
Francesco Molinari (2,3,4,5,6,12,15)
Louis Oosthuizen (2,4)
Jordan Spieth (2,3,4,8,9,15)
Henrik Stenson (2,4,15)
Tiger Woods (3,4,9,12,15)

John Daly and Todd Hamilton did not play.
Eligible but did not enter: Ian Baker-Finch, Mark Calcavecchia, Ben Curtis, Justin Leonard

2. The Open Champions for 2009–2018

3. Top 10 finishers and ties in the 2018 Open Championship

Tony Finau (4,12,15)
Kevin Kisner (4)
Matt Kuchar (4)
Eddie Pepperell (4,5)
Justin Rose (4,5,12,15)
Xander Schauffele (4,5,12)

Kevin Chappell did not play due to injury.

4. Top 50 players in the Official World Golf Ranking (OWGR) for Week 21, 2019

Kiradech Aphibarnrat (5)
Lucas Bjerregaard (5)
Keegan Bradley (12)
Rafa Cabrera-Bello (5)
Patrick Cantlay (12)
Paul Casey (12,15)
Jason Day (10,12)
Bryson DeChambeau (12,15)
Matt Fitzpatrick (5)
Tommy Fleetwood (5,12,15)
Rickie Fowler (12,15)
Jim Furyk
Sergio García (5,9,15)
Justin Harding
Tyrrell Hatton (5,15)
Billy Horschel (12)
Dustin Johnson (8,12,15)
Brooks Koepka (8,10,12,15)
Marc Leishman (12)
Li Haotong (5)
Shane Lowry
Hideki Matsuyama (12)
Alex Norén (5,6,15)
Pan Cheng-tsung
Ian Poulter (15)
Andrew Putnam
Jon Rahm (5,12,15)
Patrick Reed (5,9,12,15)
Adam Scott
Webb Simpson (11,12,15)
Cameron Smith (12)
Brandt Snedeker
Justin Thomas (10,12,15)
Matt Wallace (5)
Bubba Watson (12,15)
Gary Woodland (8,12)

Kevin Na (12) did not play due to a neck injury.

5. Top 30 on the 2018 Race to Dubai

Alexander Björk
Jorge Campillo
Ryan Fox
Russell Knox
Alexander Lévy,
Thorbjørn Olesen (15),
Adrián Otaegui
Thomas Pieters
Shubhankar Sharma (16)
Brandon Stone
Andy Sullivan
Lee Westwood
Danny Willett (9)

6. Last three BMW PGA Championship winners

Chris Wood

7. Top 5 players, not already exempt, within the top 20 of the 2019 Race to Dubai through the BMW International Open

Kurt Kitayama
David Lipsky
Robert MacIntyre
Richard Sterne
Erik van Rooyen

8. Last five U.S. Open winners

9. Last five Masters Tournament winners

10. Last six PGA Championship winners

Jimmy Walker

11. Last three Players Championship winners

Kim Si-woo

12. The 30 qualifiers for the 2018 Tour Championship

Patton Kizzire
Kyle Stanley
Aaron Wise

13. Top 5 players, not already exempt, within the top 20 of the 2019 FedEx Cup points list through the Travelers Championship

Ryan Palmer
Chez Reavie

Charles Howell III did not play.

14. Winner of the 2018 Open de Argentina

Isidro Benítez

15. Playing members of the 2018 Ryder Cup teams

16. Winner of the 2018 Asian Tour Order of Merit

17. Winner of the 2018 PGA Tour of Australasia Order of Merit

Jake McLeod (OQS Australia)

18. Winner of the 2018–19 Sunshine Tour Order of Merit

Zander Lombard

19. Winner of the 2018 Japan Open

Yuki Inamori

20. Winner of the 2019 Asia-Pacific Diamond Cup Golf

Yosuke Asaji

21. Top 2 on the 2018 Japan Golf Tour Official Money List

Shugo Imahira
Shaun Norris

22. Top player, not already exempt, on the 2019 Japan Golf Tour Official Money List through the Japan Golf Tour Championship

Mikumu Horikawa

23. Winner of the 2018 Senior Open Championship

Miguel Ángel Jiménez

24. Winner of the 2019 Amateur Championship

James Sugrue (a)

25. Winner of the 2018 U.S. Amateur
Viktor Hovland forfeited his exemption by turning professional in June 2019.

26. Winners of the 2019 European Amateur

Matti Schmid (a)

27. Recipient of the 2018 Mark H. McCormack Medal
Braden Thornberry forfeited his exemption by turning professional in December 2018.

28. Winner of the 2018 Asia-Pacific Amateur Championship

Takumi Kanaya (a)

Open Qualifying Series
The Open Qualifying Series (OQS) consisted of twelve events from the six major tours and the Korean Tour. Places were available to the leading players (not otherwise exempt) who finished in the top n and ties. In the event of ties, positions went to players ranked highest according to that week's OWGR.

Final Qualifying
The Final Qualifying events were played on 2 July at four courses covering Scotland and the North-West, Central and South-coast regions of England. Three qualifying places were available at each location, with 72 golfers competing at each. Sam Locke and Ashton Turner were successful at Final Qualifying for the second consecutive year. Brandon Wu was exempt from regional qualifying because he was ranked in the top ten in the World Amateur Golf Ranking, while Tom Thurloway was exempted by winning the 2018 English Amateur closed championship. Other qualifiers were exempted from regional qualifying by virtue of a top 1000 Official World Golf Ranking at the date of entry.

Alternates
To make up the full field of 156, additional places were allocated in ranking order from the Official World Golf Ranking at the time that these places were made available by the Championship Committee. The first 14 alternates were added using the week 25 rankings on 26 June; two of those declined spots and were replaced by the next two alternates.
From the Week 25 (week ending 23 June) Official World Golf Ranking:

An Byeong-hun (ranked 53)
J. B. Holmes (54)
Emiliano Grillo (57)
Scott Piercy (59)
Branden Grace (60)
Luke List (67)
Jason Kokrak (70)
Ryan Moore (75)
Tom Lewis (76)
Charley Hoffman (78)
Joost Luiten (79)
Lucas Glover (80)
Joel Dahmen (81)
Corey Conners (82)
Andrea Pavan (83)
Mikko Korhonen (85)

From the Week 27 (week ending 7 July) Official World Golf Ranking:

Joaquín Niemann (79)
Kevin Streelman (85) 
Rory Sabbatini (86) 
Brian Harman (88)

Weather
 Thursday: Mostly cloudy with intermittent showers.
 Friday: Mostly cloudy with occasional rain showers. Winds NNE .
 Saturday: Cloudy with periods of sunshine.
 Sunday: Due to expected inclement weather, final round tee times ran from 7:32 a.m. to 1:47 p.m. Rainy with periods of heavy rain.

Round summaries

First round
Thursday, 18 July 2019

Brooks Koepka, winner of four of the last ten majors, shot a three-under 68 and was two strokes off the lead, tied for third with twelve others. Tiger Woods hit his highest first round score in the Open, a seven-over 78. J. B. Holmes opened with 66 for a one-shot lead over early leader Shane Lowry. It was the second time he'd led in a major championship, the other time being the second round of the 2008 PGA Championship at Oakland Hills. Rory McIlroy shot an 8-over-par 79 which included a quadruple bogey eight on the first hole, a double bogey five on the 16th and a triple bogey seven on the 18th. Two weeks after his win at the Dubai Duty Free Irish Open, Jon Rahm finished two shots off the first-round lead.

Second round
Friday, 19 July 2019

After round two, Shane Lowry and J. B. Holmes shared the lead on eight under. Brooks Koepka sat at tied-8th, the 12th consecutive major he'd been in the top 20. Four players, Justin Harding (T5), Xander Schauffele (T18), Kevin Streelman (T48) and Rory McIlroy (MC), posted a second round 6-under-par 65, the current course record (since renovation). 73 professionals and no amateurs made the cut line of 143 (+1). McIlroy missed the cut by one stroke, for the first time since 2013. Tiger Woods and Phil Mickelson both missed the cut, the first time this had happened in 83 majors. Local resident Graeme McDowell, and defending champion, Francesco Molinari, made the cut on number.

Amateurs: Kanaya (+2), Sugrue (+2), Schmid (+5), Wu (+7), Knipes (+9), Thurloway (+14)

Third round
Saturday, 20 July 2019

Shane Lowry shot an 8-under-par 63 to break the course record since it was remodeled in 2016. His 197 set a new 54-hole scoring record at the Open, beating the 198 set by Tom Lehman in 1996 at Royal Lytham & St. Annes. He became the 12th player since 2000 to be leading in a major by four or more strokes, with only three of them failing to go on and win, including Lowry himself at the 2016 U.S. Open. Lee Westwood sat tied-6th in his 82nd major start, which is the second highest number of major starts without a victory, with only Jay Haas (87) having more. The light afternoon winds favoured the later starters, and led to lower scores than in the first two days.

Final round
Sunday, 21 July 2019

Summary
Sunday’s tee times were moved forward due to the adverse weather forecast. The first tee time for the final round at Royal Portrush was at 7:32am BST, with the two leaders beginning their final round at 1:47pm. Shane Lowry shot a 1-over-par 72, with only Tony Finau scoring lower (71) out of the players in the top 10 after round 3. It meant Lowry won with a six shot margin ahead Tommy Fleetwood, the highest winning margin in a major since Martin Kaymer in the 2014 U.S. Open. Lowry had a clear lead throughout the round, and was generally praised for his composure in testing weather conditions, with some remarking about the similarity to his 2009 Irish Open win when he still had amateur status.

Final leaderboard

Note: Top 10 and ties qualify for the 2020 Open Championship; top 4 and ties qualify for the 2020 Masters Tournament

Scorecard

Cumulative tournament scores, relative to par
{|class="wikitable" span = 50 style="font-size:85%;
|-
|style="background: Red;" width=10|
|Eagle
|style="background: Pink;" width=10|
|Birdie
|style="background: PaleGreen;" width=10|
|Bogey
|style="background: Green;" width=10|
|Double bogey
|style="background: Olive;" width=10|
|Triple bogey+
|}

Aftermath

Reaction from Lowry
Lowry was interviewed by host broadcaster, Sky Sports, where he discussed his victory:

"It's like an out-of-body experience! I was so calm coming down the last, I cannot believe it. The weather was awful but I had a look around, and everyone was struggling. It became a two-horse race with Tommy, and I just tried to focus on staying ahead."

"I suppose I talked to my caddie Bo a lot today, I said 'I cannot stop thinking about winning, holding the claret jug'. He just said, 'stay focused', and what a job he did today. I cannot wait to wake up tomorrow and feel what it feels like it is phenomenal."

Media and sporting reaction
Lowry's victory was widely covered in Ireland, and was featured on the front page of newspapers in both the Republic and Northern Ireland.

As Lowry advanced towards victory, the crowds gathered at Croke Park for the 2019 All-Ireland Senior Football Championship quarter-final double header received updates on the big screens in the stadium.

Statistics

Course 

Source:

Player
The leading player in each category were:

Source:

Driver conformity issues
Before the start of the championship, The R&A made random inspections of players' clubs and found four drivers out of 30 tested did not comply with the characteristic time (CT) test requirements, including that of Xander Schauffele. It was also reported that 15 drivers had failed similar testing in May 2019 at the Diamond Cup Golf event on the Japan Golf Tour.

Notes

References

External links
Royal Portrush 2019 (Official site)
Coverage on the European Tour's official site
Coverage on the PGA Tour's official site
Coverage on the PGA of America's official site

The Open Championship
Golf tournaments in Northern Ireland
Open Championship
Open Championship
Open Championship